Psychopharmacology is an international, peer-reviewed scientific journal covering the field of psychopharmacology. It is the official journal of the European Behavioural Pharmacology Society and is published by Springer Science+Business Media. The current Coordinating editors of the journal are Trevor Robbins, Christelle Baunez, and Patricia Janak.

References

External links 
 

Pharmacology journals
Neuroscience journals
English-language journals